The Ministry of Coconut Development and Janatha Estate Development is a ministry in the Government of Sri Lanka.

List of ministers

The Minister of Coconut Development and Janatha Estate Development is an appointment in the Cabinet of Sri Lanka.

Parties

See also
 List of ministries of Sri Lanka

References

External links
 Ministry of Coconut Development and Janatha Estate Development
 Government of Sri Lanka

Coconut Development and Janatha Estate Development
Coconut Development and Janatha Estate Development
Coconut organizations
Agriculture ministries
Agricultural organisations based in Sri Lanka